Garbagnate Milanese is a comune (municipality) in the Metropolitan City of Milan in the Italian region Lombardy, located about  northwest of Milan.

As of 30 November 2017, it had a population of 27.185.

Garbagnate Milanese borders the following municipalities: Caronno Pertusella, Cesate, Lainate, Senago, Arese, Bollate, Baranzate.

Garbagnate received the honorary title of city with a presidential decree on February 25, 1985.

References

External links
 Official website

Cities and towns in Lombardy